De Vlijt (English The Diligence) is a name used for windmills in the Netherlands.

De Vlijt, Diever, a windmill in Drenthe
De Vlijt, Geffen, a windmill in North Brabant
De Vlijt, Koudum, a windmill in Friesland
De Vlijt, Marle, a windmill in Overijssel
De Vlijt, Meppel, a windmill in Drenthe
De Vlijt, Wageningen, a windmill in Gelderland
De Vlijt, Wapenveld, a windmill in Gelderland
De Vlijt, Zuidwolde, a windmill in Drenthe